The Supervet: Noel Fitzpatrick (known as The Supervet from 2014 to 2019) is a Channel 4 television series following the work of Irish veterinary surgeon Noel Fitzpatrick and his team at Fitzpatrick Referrals in Eashing, Surrey. The series shows the work on some of the hardest-to-cure pets from across the country as they receive cutting-edge treatments and surgery from Fitzpatrick and his team, who attempt to cure pets that might otherwise be beyond saving.

Filmed using fixed rig cameras in the clinic's waiting room, reception and prep area, the programme captures the raw emotion, drama and playfulness of Fitzpatrick and his staff as they treat the pets in their care.

One series had the Supervet out 'on the road,' mixing up the traditional format, with visits to various dog shows and other types of pets in the community.

Episodes

Series 1 (2014)

Series 2 (2014)

Christmas Special (2014)

Series 3 (2015)

In the Field (2015)

Series 4 (2015)

Christmas Special (2015)

Series 5 (2016)

Series 6 (2016)

Bionic Specials (2016)

Series 7 (2016)

Christmas Special (2016)

Series 8 (2017)

Series 9 (2017)

Series 10 (2017)

Christmas Special (2017)

Series 11 (2018)

Series 12 (2018)

Christmas Special (2018)

Series 13 (2019)

Series 14 (2019)

Christmas Special (2019)

Series 15 (2020)

Season 15 (Summer 2020)

Christmas Special (2020)

Season 16 (2021)

Awards
The Supervet was shortlisted for the 2014, 2015 and 2016 TV Choice Awards in the category of Best Factual Entertainment and Lifestyle Show.

References

External links
 The Supervet website
 The Supervet at channel4.com
 Fitzpatrick Referrals

2014 British television series debuts
British reality television series
Channel 4 documentary series
Veterinary medicine in the United Kingdom